The Institute of Engineering and Technology, Lucknow (IET, Lucknow) is a state government-funded technical institute in Lucknow, Uttar Pradesh, India. It is a constituent college of Dr. A.P.J. Abdul Kalam Technical University (erstwhile Uttar Pradesh Technical University). It is popularly known as " Engineering College" in Lucknow. Undergraduate admissions until 2020 were being done through the Uttar Pradesh State Entrance Examinations SEE-UPTU, also known as UPSEE. From the session 2021-2022, Joint Entrance Examination – Main (JEE-MAIN) conducted by the National Testing Agency (NTA) replaced the UPSEE for future BTech (First Year) admissions in the College.

About 
IET was established by the government of Uttar Pradesh in 1984, for imparting technical education. The institute is fully financed by Uttar Pradesh Government and is being administered by the Executive Committee of Dr. A.P.J. Abdul Kalam Technical University.

The institute is fully residential. The institute was formerly affiliated (1984-2000) to the University of Lucknow and from 2000 to 2012 to Uttar Pradesh Technical University. The institute had been a constituent college of Gautam Buddh Technical University(2010-2012). Currently it is under Dr. A.P.J. Abdul Kalam Technical University(2015–present). It is an autonomous Institute, recognized by AICTE and is NBA accredited.

IET Lucknow, started in November 1984, began with the Faculty of Engineering and Technology of Lucknow University. Initially, it offered a B.Tech. degree in three branches - Computer Science, Electrical and Electronics. Within a year, two more branches - Civil and Mechanical - were introduced. Apart from this it has included Information Technology and Chemical branches as well. It has an MBA, M.TECH. and MCA course as well.
The campus was constructed by Uttar Pradesh Rajkiya Nirman Nigam Ltd (UPRNN) on a  plot purchased from the Lucknow Development Authority. UPRNN constructed a substation, academic block, eight boys’ hostels, four girls’ hostel and nearly 70 residences. LDA provided its support for construction of external roads, electric supply, drainage and sewage.

The founder director, Prof. Suresh Chandra, joined on 26 June 1984 and the teaching faculty joined their posts from 11 October 1984 onwards. The director, IET Lucknow, also assumed the office of Dean of Faculty of Engineering and Technology, Lucknow University on 25 April 1985.

Hostel and accommodation 
There are eight Boy's and four Girl's Hostels, accommodating around 2500 students. All the hostels are located within the institute campus. Each hostel has its own mess, managed by student representatives. Hostels are provided with Television, Water-Purifier, Water-Cooler, Geyser, and facilities for Indoor Games. Various hostels are Vishveshwaraiya Bhawan-A, Vishveshwaraiya Bhawan-B, Raman Bhawan-A, Raman Bhawan-B, Bhabha Hostel, Aryabhatt Hostel, Ramanujam Hostel, Ram Manohar Lohia Hostel, Gargi Bhavan (Girl's ' Hostel) Apala Hostel (Girl's Hostel) and Sarojni Bhawan (Girl's Hostel). A newly constructed ‘Maitraiyee Hostel is ready for the allotment to the girl-students.

Placement 
The institute has a placement cell. which is headed by Dr. Arun Kumar Tiwari, Professor, Mechanical Department, IET Lucknow. The institute was granted an Industry Institute Partnership Cell in 1999 by the Ministry of Human Resource Development, Government of India. The Institutes Placement Cell is equipped with dedicated interview rooms, Group Discussion rooms, computer centers and presentation rooms helping recruiters have the highest art of facility.

Departments  

 Applied Science and Humanities Department 
 Biotechnology 
 Chemical Engineering Department
 Civil Engineering Department 
 Computer Application
 Computer Science and Engineering 
 Electrical Engineering Department 
 Electronics and Communication Engineering Department 
 Mechanical Engineering Department 
 Self Finance Department

Alumni 
IET Lucknow Alumni Association or IETLAA was officially registered under the societies act on 25th May 2009. The association had its first General Body Meeting on 31st May 2009 at Scientific Convention Center, KGMU, Lucknow.

The Executive Committee of the association is an elected body that is responsible for its day to day operations. The association's constitution mandates an online election every two years to select new office bearers. The latest elections to the Executive Committee were held in July 2022. The alumni association operations are conducted on its official alumni website 'IETHUB'.

Alumni Speak series  
One of the notable activities of IETLAA is to conduct a speaker series called the "Alumni Speak". This is an interactive program which aims to give exposure to the students and alumni about different fields of industry, academia and public service. The sessions include presentations by distinguished alumni on their respective fields and an account of their professional journey after graduating from IET. The program doesn't only help students to choose their career wisely, but also gives them an insight on the preparations required to achieve their goals.

Notable alumni 
Shalini Kapoor, IBM Fellow & CTO for AI, Climate & Sustainability - AI Applications, IBM
Srijan Pal Singh, author
Ruchita Misra, author
Malti Chahar, actress

References

External links 
 IET official website
IET Alumni Association Official Website
 AKTU official website

Universities and colleges in Lucknow
Engineering colleges in Lucknow
All India Council for Technical Education
Dr. A.P.J. Abdul Kalam Technical University
Educational institutions established in 1984
1984 establishments in Uttar Pradesh